"I Believe in You and Me" is a song written by Sandy Linzer and David Wolfert in 1982. The song was first recorded and released by the R&B group The Four Tops, who released it as a single from their album One More Mountain (1982). While it failed to reach the US Top 40, it became a moderate hit for the group on the US Billboard R&B chart, peaking at number 40 in early 1983.

In 1996, R&B/pop singer Whitney Houston recorded a cover of the song for her film The Preacher's Wife and released it as a single. Following its release, the song became a top 5 pop and R&B hit in the US, also peaking on music charts worldwide.

History and composition
The original version recorded by The Four Tops was a moderate success, charting at number 40 on the US Billboard's Hot Black Singles chart.

Due to the bigger success of the Whitney Houston version, "I Believe in You and Me" is most popularly known as a Whitney Houston song. 

Shortly before the death of Four Tops lead singer Levi Stubbs in 2008, who was sidelined from the group due to complications of a stroke, and confined to a wheelchair, appeared with the other members of The Four Tops, and Aretha Franklin, and sang "I Believe In You and Me" live onstage in Detroit, in his final television appearance on From The Heart: The Four Tops 50th Anniversary Special (2004) on PBS.

Charts

Whitney Houston version

Thirteen years later in 1996, American singer and actress Whitney Houston recorded a cover of the song for her soundtrack album The Preacher's Wife, produced by Mervyn Warren and herself on the film version, and David Foster on the single version of the song.  It was released as the soundtrack's first single on December 10, 1996 by Arista Records. Houston received a Grammy nomination for Best Female R&B Vocal Performance for her performance of the song at the 40th Annual Grammy Awards on February 25, 1998.
Whitney Houston's version was edited & sampled to create a duet with Barry Manilow for his album My Dream Duets (2014).

Composition

"I Believe in You and Me" is a slow tempo R&B song with strong gospel influences. Written in the key of C major, the beat is set in common time and moves at a slow 66 beats per minute. Houston's vocals in the song spans from the low note of G3 to the high note of A5.

Critical response
J. D. Considine of The Baltimore Sun called the song "the Designated Hit Ballad" and added "[it] is pretty much what we've come to expect from Houston ― a slow, Streisand-esque build-up, a subtle sense of drama and a big, full-voiced payoff in the final chorus." Also American magazine Billboard gave the song a positive review, saying "As she did with Dolly Parton's 'I Will Always Love You,' Houston redefines the composition with a soaring, glass-shattering performance that will leave her legions of fans breathless." While reviewing the soundtrack, Elysa Gardner of Los Angeles Times wrote described it as "a cheesy classic in the tradition of 'I Will Always Love You,' with an instantly familiar melody and a poignant, bolero-like arrangement." A reviewer from Music Week commented, "More serious schmaltz from The Preacher's Wife sountrack. Clearly destined for the Top 20 and anyone with a chocolate box heart." In his review for the soundtrack, Neil Strauss from The New York Times praised the song as one of "the year's most virtuosic pop ballads."

Commercial performance
"I Believe in You and Me", the first single from The Preacher's Wife Soundtrack, debuted at number seven and number six, on the US Billboard Hot 100 and Hot R&B Singles charts, the issue date of December 28, 1996, respectively. Four weeks later, on January 25, 1997, it was released in the R&B marketplace as a two-sided single with "Somebody Bigger Than You and I" from the soundtrack. It peaked at number four on the Billboard Hot R&B chart, staying on the chart for 20 weeks. The following week, it also reached a peak of number four on the Billboard Hot 100 chart, becoming Houston's 16th top five hit. The song entered the Billboard Adult Contemporary chart at number 19, the issue date of December 14, 1996 and peaked at number two, making it her 21st top ten hit of the chart, the issue date of March 1, 1997. The song was ranked thirty-three on the 1997 Billboard Year-end Hot 100 Singles chart. Additionally, "I Believe in You and Me/Somebody Bigger Than You and I" two-sided single placed at position number twenty-nine on the 1997 Billboard Year-end Hot R&B Singles chart. On the Billboard Adult R&B Songs list, the song peaked at number one staying there for four weeks. 

The single was certified Platinum for the shipments of 1,000,000 copies or more by the Recording Industry Association of America (RIAA) on February 4, 1997, becoming Houston's fourth Platinum single.

Worldwide, it was released as the second single from the soundtrack after "Step by Step". The single peaked at number 16 on the UK Singles Chart, number 59 in Canada and number 46 in Sweden.

Live performances

Houston performed "I Believe in You and Me" on Saturday Night Live on December 14, 1996. Houston also sang the song on the National Lottery show, broadcast live on the BBC in the United Kingdom on March 15, 1997. The song was performed in some concerts on her 1998 European Tour. For her 1999 My Love Is Your Love World Tour, it was used to open a medley of movie soundtrack songs. Houston performed the song along with "I Will Always Love You" as a part of medley for the 25th Anniversary Celebration of Arista Records, taped at the Shrine Auditorium in Los Angeles on April 10 and later broadcast on NBC, May 15, 2000. In 2004, she performed a similar medley as part of a tribute to Clive Davis at the 16th World Music Awards on September 15, 2004.  This performance was included in the 2014 CD/DVD release, Whitney Houston Live: Her Greatest Performances.

Track listings and formats

 US, CD maxi-single
 "I Believe In You And Me" (Record Version) — 3:51 	
 "Somebody Bigger Than You And I" — 4:41 A 	
 "I Believe In You And Me" (Film Version) — 4:00
 "The Lord Is My Shepherd" — 4:23
 "Who Would Imagine a King" — 2:48

 Europe, CD maxi-single
 "I Believe In You And Me" (Single Version) — 3:51 	
 "Step By Step" (Radio Remix) — 3:56 B 	
 "Step By Step" (K-Klassic Remix) — 10:06 C 	
A Produced and Arranged by Rickey MinorB Additional Production and Remix by Tony MoranC Additional Production and Remix by K-Klass

 UK, CD single
 "I Believe in You and Me" (Single Version) — 3:51 	
 "Step By Step" (Tony Moran Diva X Diva Mix) — 10:04 B 	
 "Step By Step" (K-Klassic Mix) — 10:06 C 	

 Australia, CD maxi-single
 "I Believe in You and Me" (Single Version) — 3:51 	
 "Step By Step" (Tony Moran Radio Remix) — 3:56 B 	
 "Step By Step" (K-Klassic Mix) — 10:06 C

Notable cover versions
 CeCe Winans performed the song to tribute to Whitney Houston, the first ever recipient of the Triumphant Spirit Award at the 10th annual Essence Awards, taped on April 4, 1997 and broadcast later on Fox TV, May 22, 1997. 
 At the 12th annual Soul Train Music Awards on February 27, 1998, the song was performed by Kenny Lattimore and Terry Ellis as part of a musical tribute to Houston, who was honored with the Quincy Jones Award for outstanding career achievements in the field of entertainment on the ceremony. 
 Kim Burrell sang the jazzy version of the song to tribute to Houston, who was honoree in entertainment field, and received a standing ovation on The 2010 BET Honors, taped at the Warner Theatre on January 16 and later aired on BET, February 1, 2010. 
 Usher performed this song in the CBS special "Grammy presents: We Will Always Love You, Whitney Houston".
 American R&B singer, David Peaston, won a Soul Train Music Award for Best R&B/Soul or Rap New Artist, also recorded the song for his Mixed Emotions album (1991).

Charts and certifications

Weekly charts

Year-end charts

Certifications

|}

References

External links
I Believe in You and Me at Discogs

1982 songs
1983 singles
1996 singles
1997 singles
Four Tops songs
Whitney Houston songs
Songs written by Sandy Linzer
Pop ballads
Rhythm and blues ballads
Music videos directed by F. Gary Gray
Casablanca Records singles
Arista Records singles
1990s ballads